Elkhart Airport may refer to:

 Elkhart Municipal Airport, in Elkhart, Indiana, United States
 Elkhart-Morton County Airport, in Elkhart, Kansas, United States